I'm on My Way may refer to:

Film
 I'm on My Way (film), a 1919 short comedy film

Music
 I'm on My Way, an album by Jackie Moore, 1979
 "I'm on My Way" (traditional song), a gospel song
 "I'm on My Way" (Captain & Tennille song), 1978
 "I'm on My Way" (Dean Parrish song), 1967
 "I'm on My Way" (The Proclaimers song), 1989
 "I'm on My Way", a song by Betty Boo from GRRR! It's Betty Boo, 1992
 "I'm on My Way", a song by Gotthard from Dial Hard, 1994

See also
 On My Way (disambiguation)